The Celebes dwarf squirrel (Prosciurillus murinus) is a species of rodent in the family Sciuridae. It is endemic to northeast and central Sulawesi, Indonesia, and is also found on nearby islands including Sangir Island.

References

Prosciurillus
Rodents of Sulawesi
Mammals described in 1844
Taxonomy articles created by Polbot